Muhammed Çalhanoğlu (born 19 April 1995) is a Turkish-German footballer who plays as a midfielder.

Personal life
He is the younger brother of fellow footballer Hakan Çalhanoğlu, and the cousin of Kerim Çalhanoğlu.

References

External links
 
 
 

1995 births
Living people
German people of Turkish descent
Footballers from Mannheim
Turkish footballers
German footballers
Association football midfielders
Turkey youth international footballers
Karlsruher SC II players
SK Austria Klagenfurt players
Gümüşhanespor footballers
Fatih Karagümrük S.K. footballers
Regionalliga players
2. Liga (Austria) players
TFF Second League players
Turkish expatriate footballers
Turkish expatriate sportspeople in Austria
Expatriate footballers in Austria